Naushad Shaikh (born 15 October 1991) is an Indian cricketer who has played in more than 100 matches across all three formats since he made his debut in 2015. He made his first-class debut for Maharashtra in the 2016–17 Ranji Trophy on 13 October 2016. He made his Twenty20 debut for Maharashtra in the 2016–17 Inter State Twenty-20 Tournament on 29 January 2017. Ahead of the 2019–20 Ranji Trophy, Shaikh was appointed as the captain of the Maharashtra team for the tournament.

References

External links
 

1991 births
Living people
Indian cricketers
Maharashtra cricketers
People from Osmanabad district